Twyford School is a co-educational, private, preparatory boarding and day school, located in the village of Twyford, Hampshire, England.

History
Twyford states itself to be the oldest preparatory school in the United Kingdom.
It moved to its present site in 1809, but there has been a school for boys in Twyford since the seventeenth century.  During the nineteenth century buildings were added, including a large schoolroom built during the 1820s, and a mid-Victorian chapel. Original buildings are still used and form part of today's campus.

In 1859, while George Kitchin was master of the school, his friend Lewis Carroll took a photograph of Kitchin and his class of nine boys.

Current status
A series of developments coincided with the admission of girls to the school, and have continued in recent years. Building works and improvements have been undertaken, although historic fabric has generally been retained. In addition the sports grounds and other outdoor facilities have been upgraded.

Twyford is a private school, and a registered charity. It accepts both day pupils and boarders, and has a pre-preparatory school on the same campus for children below the age of five. It has capacity for around 400 pupils between the ages of 3 and 13, with boarders being accepted from the age of 8. It is a Church of England school.

Headmasters
To 1692: Rev. Thomas Brown, alias Weatherby
From 1692: Rev. William Husband, alias Bernard
1855 to 1861: Rev. George Kitchin, later Dean of Winchester in 1883, then Dean of Durham from 1894 to 1912, and from 1908 to 1912, Chancellor of the University of Durham
1862 to 1887: Reverend Lathom Wickham
1887: Reverend Charles Townshend Wickham
1939 to 1963: Reverend Robert ("Bob") G. Wickham       
1963 to 1983: David. T. Wickham MA (Oxon)
1983 to 1996: Peter Richard Douglas Gould
1996 to 2003: Philip Fawkes
2003 to 2009: Dr David Livingstone
2009 to 2020: Dr Steve Bailey, previously a master at Winchester College
2020 Andrew Harvey 

In 1984, Donald Leinster-Mackay noted that "The Wickham family have provided headmasters for Twyford School since 1834.

Notable old boys
See also :Category:People educated at Twyford School
Alexander Pope (1688–1744), poet 
Thomas Talbot (1727–1795), Roman Catholic bishop
James Talbot (1726–1790), priest
William Loring (1811–1895), Royal Navy officer
Thomas Hughes (1822–1896), lawyer and author
Thomas Baring, 1st Earl of Northbrook (1826–1904) 
Philip Sclater (1829–1913), lawyer and zoologist
Sir Robert Biddulph (1835–1918), soldier
Charles Eamer Kempe (1837–1907) designer of stained glass
Wilfrid Scawen Blunt (1840–1922), poet 
Thomas Garnier (1841–1898), clergyman and cricketer
Robert Moberly (1845–1915), priest
Edwin Dodgson (1846–1918), clergyman and missionary, brother of Charles Lutwidge Dodgson (Lewis Carroll)
Sir Henry Hallam Parr (1847–1914), soldier
Sir Hubert Parry (1848–1918), composer
Arthur Woollgar Verrall (1851–1912), classical scholar
George Kemball (1858–1941), soldier 
Edward Christian (1858–1934), footballer and tea-trader
John Rawlinson (1860–1926), lawyer and politician 
Walter Congreve (1862–1927), soldier 
Arthur Christian (1863–1926), Royal Navy officer
Edwyn Alexander-Sinclair (1865–1945), Royal Navy officer
John Poynder Dickson-Poynder, 1st Baron Islington (1866–1936), Governor General of New Zealand 
Andrew Hamilton Russell (1868–1960), New Zealand soldier 
Walter Roch (1880–1965), landowner and politician 
John Minshull-Ford (1881–1948), soldier and Lieutenant Governor of Guernsey 
Roscow Shedden (1882–1956), bishop 
Clarence Napier Bruce (1885–1957), sportsman
Sir George Gater (1886–1963), soldier and civil servant 
Roland Philipps (1890–1916), soldier, killed in action
Alban Arnold (1892–1916), cricketer
Ernest Fraser Jacob (1894–1971), scholar
Gerald Vernon (1899–1963), bishop 
William Andrewes (1899–1974), Royal Navy officer 
Ralph George Scott Bankes (1900–1948), barrister
Sir Michael Perrin (1905–1988), nuclear physicist 
Richard Crossman (1907–1974), politician 
Amherst Barrow Whatman (1909–1984), radio engineer
Claude Sclater (1910-1986), naval officer
Lynch Maydon (1913–1971), naval officer and politician 
George Rudolf Hanbury Fielding (1915–2005), soldier
Terence Edward Armstrong (1920–1996), arctic geographer 
Desmond Norman (1929–2002), aircraft designer 
Jock Bruce-Gardyne, (1930–1990), politician
Douglas Hurd (born 1930), politician
Mark Tully (born 1935), BBC overseas correspondent
Humphrey Taylor (born 1938), bishop 
Christopher Orlebar (1945–2018), Concorde pilot
Ralph Palmer, 12th Baron Lucas (born 1951), publisher and politician
Andrew Longmore (1953–2019), cricketer and journalist

References

Further reading
C. T. Wickham, ed., "The Story of Twyford School 1809-1909" (Winchester: Wykeham Press, 1909)
Rev. Robert G Wickham, "Shades of the Prison House: Glimpses of school life at Twyford over the past three hundred years" (Foxbury Press, 1986)

External links
School Website
Profile on the ISC website
ISI Inspection Reports

 
Preparatory schools in Hampshire
Boarding schools in Hampshire
Co-educational boarding schools